Ocellularia raveniana is a species of corticolous lichen in the family Graphidaceae. Found in Sri Lanka, it was formally described as a new species in 2014 by lichenologists Gothamie Weerakoon, Robert Lücking, and Helge Thorsten Lumbsch. The lichen is only known to occur at the type locality and in the Sabaragamuwa Mountain Range. The specific epithet raveniana honours botanist and environmentalist Peter H. Raven, longtime director and now President Emeritus of the Missouri Botanical Garden. Its ascospores are hyaline, oblong to ellipsoid in shape, contain seven to nine septa, and measure 25–35 by 8–10 μm. Secondary chemicals present in the lichen include protocetraric acid, and virensic acid.

See also
 List of Ocellularia species

References

raveniana
Lichen species
Lichens of Sri Lanka
Lichens described in 2014
Taxa named by Helge Thorsten Lumbsch
Taxa named by Robert Lücking
Taxa named by Gothamie Weerakoon